The Australian Capital Territory Women cricket team, also known as the Intravision ACT Meteors, is the women's representative cricket team for the Australian Capital Territory. They play most of their home games at Manuka Oval, Canberra and they also use Phillip Oval, Canberra. They compete in the Women's National Cricket League (WNCL), the premier 50-over women's cricket tournament in Australia. They previously played in the now-defunct Australian Women's Twenty20 Cup and Australian Women's Cricket Championships.

History

1978–1995: Australian Women's Cricket Championships
Australian Capital Territory's first recorded match was against Queensland in the Australian Women's Cricket Championships on 27 to 28 December 1978, which they won on first innings. With the exception of 1980–81, they subsequently competed in every Australian Women's Cricket Championships up to and including its penultimate season in 1994–95. Their best finish came in 1992–93, when they drew the third-place playoff with Western Australia but secured third place based on first innings score.

2009–present: Twenty20 Cup and Women's National Cricket League

Australian Capital Territory joined the Australian Women's Twenty20 Cup and the WNCL in 2009–10, finishing a respectable third in both competitions.

Australian Capital Territory finished fourth in the 2013–14 Twenty20 Cup and qualified for the semi-finals, where they met New South Wales. Australian Capital Territory won the match by 12 runs thanks to six wickets from Rhiannon Dick. However, they lost the final to Queensland by seven wickets after scoring only 107 batting first.

Grounds
Prior to joining the WNCL, Australian Capital Territory played their home games at a number of grounds in Canberra, including Kingston Oval, Reid Oval, Manuka Oval, Stirling Oval, Kaleen Oval, Boomanulla Oval, O'Connor Oval, Deakin West Ground and St Edmund's College Oval.

After joining the WNCL in 2009–10, Australian Capital Territory used Manuka Oval for all of their home matches until 2012. In 2012 and 2013 they played home matches at Freebody Oval in Queanbeyan, Chisholm Oval in Canberra and Robertson Oval in Wagga Wagga. Since 2014 they have resumed playing at the Manuka Oval for the majority of their matches. They have also started to use Phillip Oval, Canberra, playing their first match there against England on 28 January 2020. They played their five 2020–21 WNCL home games and their six 2021–22 WNCL home games at Phillip Oval (now also known as EPC Solar Park). In the 2022–23 WNCL, they split their home matches between Phillip Oval and Manuka Oval.

Players

Current squad
Based on squad announced for the 2022/23 season. Players in bold have international caps.

Notable players
Players who have played for Australian Capital Territory and played internationally are listed below, in order of first international appearance (given in brackets):

 Christina Matthews (1984)
 Lyn Larsen (1984)
 Glenda Hall (1984)
 Frances Leonard (1986)
 Cathy Smith (1987)
 Lynette Cook (1987)
 Jodie Davis (1988)
 Bronwyn Calver (1991)
 Kim Fazackerley (1992)
 Kate Pulford (1999)
 Leanne Davis (2000)
 Nicola Browne (2002)
 Sara McGlashan (2002)
 Kris Britt (2003)
 Leonie Coleman (2004)
 Jodie Fields (2006)
 Lynsey Askew (2006)
 Rene Farrell (2007)
 Erin Osborne (2009)
 Dane van Niekerk (2009)
 Marizanne Kapp (2009)
 Sian Ruck (2009)
 Sarah Coyte (2010)
 Lea Tahuhu (2011)
 Georgia Elwiss (2011)
 Holly Ferling (2013)
 Hayley Jensen (2014)
 Jannatul Ferdus (2018)
 Erin Burns (2019)

Coaching staff
 Head coach: Jono Dean

Honours
Australian Women's Cricket Championships:
Winners (0):
Best finish: 3rd (1991–92, 1992–93)
Women's National Cricket League:
Winners (0):
Best finish: 3rd (2009–10, 2010–11, 2011–12)
Australian Women's Twenty20 Cup (0):
Winners (0):
Best finish: runners-up (2013–14)

See also
ACT Comets

References

 
Australian women's cricket teams
Met
Sporting clubs in Canberra